The IEEE Journal of Selected Topics in Quantum Electronics is a bimonthly peer-reviewed scientific journal published by the IEEE Photonics Society. It covers research on quantum electronics. The editor-in-chief is José Capmany (Universitat Politècnica de València). According to the Journal Citation Reports, the journal has a 2020 impact factor of 4.544.

See also 
 IEEE Journal of Quantum Electronics

References

External links 
 

Journal of Selected Topics in Quantum Electronics
Quantum mechanics journals
Optics journals
Electronics journals
Bimonthly journals
English-language journals
Publications established in 1995